The P400-class patrol vessels are small patrol boats of the French Navy. They were designed to accomplish police operations in the French exclusive economic zone (EEZ). They were built by the Constructions Mécaniques de Normandie, which specialise in small military craft. Two similar ships are in service in Gabon. The P400 class were originally designed in two versions: one armed with Exocet MM38 missiles, and another public service version with a smaller 16-man complement; eventually neither of these versions were commissioned as the French Navy chose an intermediate version.

All of these craft were based in overseas territories (DOM/TOM) where they conducted sea monitoring missions and secured the EEZ. They also executed missions in the context of French agreements with other nations, typically supporting foreign armies or carrying out humanitarian missions.

Design
The P400 class are fitted with a hydraulic crane capable of lifting . This allows to use them for anti-pollution operations, by embarking and debarking equipment and anti-pollution chemicals, and to lift out small craft whilst at sea. An unusual feature for ships of this size, the Operational Centre allows a complete monitoring of close surface situations, using radar indicators and tracking tables. The engine can now be monitored remotely, which allows for a smaller crew. The maintenance of the ship was simplified notably by choosing those solutions which allow to clean the ship whilst in populated areas. The P400 class can stay 15 days at sea, and have 20 days of food supplies for 28 adults.

The engines of the P400 have been a constant source of technical problems since the maiden voyage of the lead ship L'Audacieuse to Dakar.

The first problem that occurred related to the carter reductor, then with the transmission, and eventually with a piston - this last item being the most worrying, since it was probably a symptom of a conception problem. This shed a bad light on Alstom who were trying to compete against German motors by MTU. French humourist Coluche came up with the witty remark Après l'Audacieuse, la Boudeuse, la Capricieuse,… voici venu le temps de la Dépanneuse ! (After the Audacieuse, the Boudeuse, the Capricieuse, time has come for the Tow-Truck!). After these problems were solved, larger exhaust pipes had to be fixed (originally, exhaust was vented underwater to minimise infra-red signature, but it turned out that the ship was taking water from these openings).

After further studies, it became possible to gain the space of one propulsion compartment, which is now used for cargo and personnel. The ships can ferry 20 people, and up to 60 for short travel with a calm sea.

Service history
In May 2009, La Fougueuse arrived in Brest to be decommissioned, the first of the P400 class to be taken out of service.

In February 2011, it was decided that eight P400-class vessels will be equipped with new engines. Previously, these ships were scheduled to retire according to Jane's Navy International. They will repair to ensure renewal of their operation until 2020. Earlier, the French Navy had intended to retire these ships in the period from 2010 to 2014. The reason for extending the service life of ships of this class is the desire to reduce the cost of procurement of new weapons.

The ships were initially equipped with two Wartsila SACM UD30 V16 M3 diesel engines. The new engines will be delivered to France's Mother Boda and installed by "Piriu Naval Service" (PNS - Piriou Naval Services) in a 10-year contract worth €30 million (US$39 million). The first of the modernised ships should be returned to the French Navy by March 2011. PNS also undertakes restoration of these ships.

One of the decommissioned vessels, La Tapageuse, was offered to the Philippine Coast Guard, and was estimated to cost about €6 million including the refurbishing works. The deal did not push through, and French shipbuilder Piriou took control of the ship, which was later sold to Gabon as part of a larger deal.

Replacements

In December 2019 six  Patrouilleur Outre-mer (POM-type) patrol vessels were ordered as replacements for the P400s as well as for other French coast guard vessels. These were to be delivered between 2022 and 2025 to protect the exclusive economic zone of French overseas territories in the Indian Ocean and the Pacific. In May 2021, it was reported that the delivery of the first of these vessels would be delayed, from an originally planned in-service date of 2022, until 2023.

Ships
 P682 L'Audacieuse (Degrad des Cannes), decommissioned in 2011.
 P683 La Boudeuse (La Réunion),  decommissioned in 2011.
 P684 La Capricieuse (Degrad des Cannes), decommissioned in 2017.
 P685 La Fougueuse (Fort-de-France),  decommissioned in 2009.
 P686 La Glorieuse (Nouméa)
 P687 La Gracieuse (Fort-de-France), decommissioned in 2017.
 P688 La Moqueuse (Nouméa) decommissioned in 2020.
 P689 La Railleuse (Papeete),  decommissioned in 2011.
 P690 La Rieuse (La Réunion), donated to the Kenya Navy in 2011, renamed KNS Harambee II.
 P691 La Tapageuse (Papeete),  decommissioned in 2012, sold to Gabonese Navy in 2014, renamed CV Bivigou Nziengui

References

Patrol vessels of the French Navy
Patrol boat classes
Ship classes of the French Navy